Gil Gonzalo Ortega Garrido Sr. (born 1 September 1919) is a Panamanian former Negro league infielder who played in the 1940s. 

A native of Panama City, Panama, Garrido is the father of major leaguer Gil Garrido. He made his Negro leagues debut in 1944 with the New York Cubans, and played for New York again the following season before going on to play in the Mexican League in 1946.

References

External links
 and Seamheads

1919 births
Possibly living people
New York Cubans players
Panamanian expatriate baseball players in the United States
Sportspeople from Panama City
Industriales de Monterrey players
Panamanian expatriate baseball players in Mexico
Baseball infielders